Kelupis (which literally translates to 'glutinous rice rolls' in English) is a traditional kuih for the Bruneian Malay people in the country of Brunei and in the states of Sabah and Sarawak in Malaysia. It is also a traditional snack for the Bisaya people as the three ethnics are ethnically related which is Lun Bawang/Lundayeh also create this kelupis especially on the wedding ceremony.

See also 
 Lamban

References 

Glutinous rice dishes
Bruneian cuisine
Malaysian snack foods